Faḍāla ibn ʿUbayd al-Anṣārī (Phadalas in Greek sources; died 673 or 678/79) was the qadi of Damascus and a commander under the Umayyad caliph Mu'awiya I. The Islamic and Byzantine sources variously report several military campaigns, including a number of naval raids, headed by Fadala between 667/68 and 672. His wintering in Cyzicus has been associated with the first Arab siege of Constantinople. He is generally held to have died as qadi in Damascus in 673 by the Muslim sources, though Khalifa ibn Khayyat places his death in 678/79.

Early life and career
Fadala ibn Ubayd was a companion of the Islamic prophet Muhammad and belonged to the Ansar (early supporters of Muhammad from Medina). He participated in the Muslim conquest of Egypt in the early 640s, then settled in Damascus in Syria. There, he was a student of Abu Darda' al-Ansari (d. 652), the qadi (head judge) of the city. Abu Darda' chose him as his successor. Fadala was among the minority of Ansarites who did not pay homage to Caliph Ali, who acceded following the killing of Caliph Uthman in 656. Fadala and the minority of Ansarites, including Zayd ibn Thabit, Maslama ibn Mukhallad and Nu'man ibn Bashir, were considered Uthmaniyya (partisans of Uthman).

Commander in Arab–Byzantine wars
Fadala was a general in the Arab–Byzantine wars under Caliph Mu'awiya I. Theophilus of Edessa (d. 785) placed Fadala (Phadalas) as the commander of the winter campaign against the Hexapolis in 667/68, and held that he was reinforced by Mu'awiya's son Yazid in the following year. According to al-Khwarazimi and al-Tabari (d. 923), Fadala led the winter campaign against the Byzantines in 669/670, during which he took numerous captives, according to al-Ya'qubi (d. 897). Ibn Abd al-Hakam (d. 871) noted that Fadala led the Syrian naval forces, while Uqba ibn Amir led the Egyptian navy. The same historian held that Fadala wintered in Cyzicus, across the Sea of Marmara from the Byzantine capital Constantinople, in 671/72.  Al-Ya'qubi and al-Tabari list him as the commander of the winter campaign against the Byzantines again in 671/72, while Khalifa ibn Khayyat (d. 854) noted that he led the Arab naval forces during that campaign. The object of that campaign, which was a raid, was traditionally interpreted as being the island of Djerba in modern Tunisia, though the historian Marek Jankowiak argues the evidence for this to be insufficient.

Death
Fadala died in Damascus as qadi in 673, according to most Muslim sources. Theophanes the Confessor (d. 818) mentioned that Fadala and Abdallah ibn Qays raided Crete in 674. Ibn Khayyat placed Fadala's death in 678/79. He was buried near Abu Darda' and his wife Umm al-Darda' in the Bab al-Saghir cemetery, where his tomb was a visitation site as late as the 16th century. Fadala was succeeded by Abu Darda's son Bilal or al-Nu'aym ibn Bashir. One of Fadala's students, Abd al-Rahman ibn al-Hashas al-Udhri, served as the qadi of Damascus under Caliph Umar II.

References

Bibliography

670s deaths
Ansar (Islam)
Companions of the Prophet
Qadis
People from Damascus
Umayyad people of the Arab–Byzantine wars